Crow Indian Lake is a lake in Alberta, Canada.

Crow Indian Lake takes its name from the Crow Nation.

See also
List of lakes of Alberta

References

Lakes of Alberta